Koua is a town in western Ivory Coast. It is a sub-prefecture of Facobly Department in Guémon Region, Montagnes District.

Koua was a commune until March 2012, when it became one of 1126 communes nationwide that were abolished.

In 2014, the population of the sub-prefecture of Koua was 8,515.

Villages
The four villages of the sub-prefecture of Koua and their population in 2014 are:
 Flansobly (3 217)
 Klangbolably (1 506)
 Koua (1 890)
 Tiébly (1 902)

Notes

Sub-prefectures of Guémon
Former communes of Ivory Coast